The California Amateur Championship or California Amateur is a golf championship held in California for the state's top amateur golfers. The tournament is run by the California Golf Association. The first event was held in 1912 at the Del Monte Golf Club. It was played at Pebble Beach Golf Links from 1919 to 2006. The tournament rotates between Northern California and Southern California, and involves two rounds of stroke play followed by match play.

Winners

2022 Charlie Reiter
2021 Noah Woolsey
2020 Joey Vrzich
2019 William Mouw
2018 Bobby Bucey
2017 P. J. Samiere
2016 Shintaro Ban
2015 Shotaro Ban
2014 Xander Schauffele
2013 Cory McElyea
2012 Kevin Marsh
2011 Bhavik Patel
2010 Scott Travers
2009 Geoff Gonzalez
2008 Nick Delio
2007 Josh Anderson
2006 Jordan Nasser
2005 Don DuBois
2004 Spencer Levin
2003 Patrick Nagle
2002 Eddie Heinen
2001 Darryl Donovan
2000 Nick Jones
1999 Tim Hogarth
1998 Ed Cuff Jr.
1997 Jason Gore
1996 Mark Johnson
1995 Jeff Sanday
1994 Steve Woods
1993 Casey Boyns
1992 Todd Demsey
1991 Harry Rudolph III
1990 Charlie Wi
1989 Casey Boyns
1988 Don Parsons
1987 Mike Springer
1986 Terrence Miskell
1985 Sam Randolph
1984 Duffy Waldorf
1983 Kris Moe
1982 Gary Vanier
1981 Joe Tamburino
1980 Bobby Clampett
1979 Mark O'Meara
1978 Bobby Clampett
1977 Lee Mikles
1976 Mike Brannan
1975 John Cook
1974 Curtis Worley
1973 Mike Brannan
1972 Mac Hunter, Jr.
1971 Doug Nelson
1970 Bob Risch
1969 Forrest Fezler
1968 Johnny Miller
1967 Bob E. Smith
1966 Bob Eastwood
1965 Vern Callison
1964 Steve Oppermann
1963 Paul Travis
1962 Dick Lotz
1961 John Richardson
1960 Larry Bouchey
1959 Vern Callison
1958 Eli Bariteau
1957 Tal Smith
1956 Ken Venturi
1955 Bud Taylor
1954 Bud Taylor
1953 Gene Littler
1952 Bob Silvestri
1951 Ken Venturi	
1950 Bob Gardner
1949 Mac Hunter	
1948 Eli Bariteau
1947 Bob Gardner
1946 Bruce McCormick
1945 Bruce McCormick
1944 Ernie Pieper, Jr.
1943 Elmer Cites
1942 Johnny Dawson
1941 Ernie Pieper, Jr.
1940 Ed Monaghan
1939 Jack Gage
1938 Roger Kelly
1937 Roger Kelly
1936 Mat Palacio, Jr.
1935 Jack Gaines
1934 Stuart Hawley
1933 Charles Seaver
1932 Neil White
1931 David Martin
1930 Francis H.I. Brown
1929 Jack F. Neville
1928 J.J. McHugh
1927 J.J. McHugh
1926 Chandler Egan
1925 George Von Elm
1924 Capt. A. Bullock-Webster
1923 J.J. McHugh
1922 Jack F. Neville
1921 Paul Hunter
1920 Paul Hunter
1919 Jack F. Neville
1918 Douglas Grant
1917 Chas H. Walter
1916 Larry Cowing
1915 E.S. Armstrong
1914 H.K.B. Davis
1913 Jack F. Neville
1912 Jack F. Neville

Source:

References

External links

Amateur golf tournaments in the United States
Golf in California
Recurring sporting events established in 1912
1912 establishments in California